Konstantin Alekseyevich Ivliev (born 7 August 2000) is a Russian short track speed skater. He competed at the 2022 Winter Olympics.

Career
Ivliev competed at the 2021 European Championships where he won a gold medal in the 500 metres, and a bronze medal in the 5000 metre relay.

He represented the Russian Olympic Committee athletes at the 2022 Winter Olympics and won a silver medal in the 500 metres event.

References

2000 births
Living people
Russian male short track speed skaters
Speed skaters from Moscow
Olympic short track speed skaters of Russia
Short track speed skaters at the 2022 Winter Olympics
Medalists at the 2022 Winter Olympics
Olympic medalists in short track speed skating
Olympic silver medalists for the Russian Olympic Committee athletes
Competitors at the 2019 Winter Universiade
Universiade silver medalists for Russia
Universiade bronze medalists for Russia
Universiade medalists in short track speed skating